The Diocese of Bismarck is a Latin Church ecclesiastical territory or diocese of the Catholic Church in North Dakota. The current bishop of the diocese is Bishop David Kagan. It is a suffragan diocese in the ecclesiastical province of the metropolitan Archdiocese of Saint Paul and Minneapolis. The see city for the diocese is Bismarck.  The cathedral parish of the diocese is Cathedral of the Holy Spirit. The diocese encompasses 24 North Dakota counties: Adams, Billings, Bowman, Burke, Burleigh, Divide, Dunn, Emmons, Golden Valley, Grant, Hettinger, McKenzie, McLean, Mercer, Morton, Mountrail, Oliver, Renville, Sioux, Slope, Stark, Ward and Williams counties (along with the western part of Bottineau County).

History
On December 31, 1909 Saint Pius X established the Diocese of Bismarck. Its territory was taken from the Diocese of Fargo.

Accusations of clergy sexual abuse
On January 2, 2019, the Diocese of Bismarck released the names of 22 Catholic clergy who, since 1950, were accused of committing acts of sex abuse while serving in the Diocese of Bismarck.

Bishops
The list of bishops of the diocese and their terms of service:
 John Baptist Vincent de Paul Wehrle, O.S.B. (1910–1939)
 Vincent James Ryan (1940–1951)
 Lambert Anthony Hoch (1952–1956), appointed Bishop of Sioux Falls
 Hilary Baumann Hacker (1956–1982)
 John Francis Kinney (1982–1995), appointed Bishop of Saint Cloud
 Paul Albert Zipfel (1996–2011)
 David D. Kagan (2011–Present)

Other priests of this diocese who became Bishops
 Sylvester William Treinen, appointed Bishop of Boise City in 1962
 Austin Anthony Vetter, appointed Bishop of Helena in 2019

Diocesan officers
Bishop
Chancellor
Financial Officer
Judicial Vicar
Vicar General

Diocesan area
The diocese ministers to approximately 66,400 Catholic church members.

Diocesan offices
The diocese has 17 offices, including:

Canonical Affairs
Chancery
Communication
Faith Formation
Family Ministry
Fiscal & Properties Management
Insurance & Risk Management
Missionary Activity
Permanent Diaconate
Protecting the Children
Publications & Promotions
Stewardship and Development
Vocations
Worship
Youth Ministry

Diocesan consultative groups
Corporate Board
Expansion Fund Board
Finance Council
Permanent Diaconate Commission
Priests' Benefit Association
Priests' Personnel Board
Presbyterial Council

High schools
Bishop Ryan High School, Minot
St. Mary's Central High School, Bismarck
Trinity High School, Dickinson

See also

 Catholic Church by country
 Catholic Church in the United States
 Ecclesiastical Province of Saint Paul and Minneapolis
 Global organisation of the Catholic Church
 List of Roman Catholic archdioceses (by country and continent)
 List of Roman Catholic dioceses (alphabetical) (including archdioceses)
 List of Roman Catholic dioceses (structured view) (including archdioceses)
 List of the Catholic dioceses of the United States

Notes

External links
Roman Catholic Diocese of Bismarck
Roman Catholic Diocese of Bismarck Official Site-archives

 
Bismarck
Christian organizations established in 1909
Diocese of Bismarck
Bismarck
Bismarck